Telgruc-sur-Mer (literally Telgruc on Sea) is a commune in the Finistère department of Brittany in north-western France.

Population
Inhabitants of Telgruc-sur-Mer are called in French Telgruciens.

Geography

Historically, it belongs to Cornouaille.

Map

See also
Communes of the Finistère department
Parc naturel régional d'Armorique

References

External links

Official website 

Mayors of Finistère Association 

Communes of Finistère
Populated coastal places in France